The vast majority of roads in the United States are maintained by the state or lower-level agencies. However, some roads are maintained by the federal government. Most of these are minor roads in national parks and national forests, which are not listed here. However, a few roads have been developed to connect sites in the national park system or to protect routes of scenic or historic significance, and some roads in national parks or National Parkways are major enough to list.

Roads that are part of other park service sites:

Clara Barton Parkway in Clara Barton National Historic Site
Colonial Parkway in Colonial National Historical Park
Going-to-the-Sun Road in Glacier National Park
Pierce Stocking Scenic Drive in the Sleeping Bear Dunes National Lakeshore
Rock Creek and Potomac Parkway in Rock Creek Park
Skyline Drive in Shenandoah National Park
Trail Ridge Road in Rocky Mountain National Park

Other federally maintained roads:

The Woodrow Wilson Bridge, is owned by the Federal Highway Administration but maintained by the Maryland State Highway Administration, Virginia Department of Transportation and United States Coast Guard.

 The Pit River Bridge (officially the Veterans of Foreign Wars Memorial Bridge) is a double-deck, deck truss, road and rail bridge over Shasta Lake in Shasta County, California, owned by the US Department of Interior's Bureau of Reclamation and maintained by California Department of Transportation.

The Pentagon road network (also known as "The Mixing Bowl") was federally owned until 1964, when it was transferred to Virginia.
The Sagamore Bridge and Bourne Bridge over the Cape Cod Canal as well as the road bridges over the Chesapeake and Delaware Canal are owned by the U.S. Army Corps of Engineers.

See also

References

External links
 Office of Federal Lands Highway, provides information on all federally owned roads

Federal
Roads